Manoj Tigga is an Indian politician and a Member of Legislative assembly representing the Madarihat constituency in West Bengal. In the 2016 West Bengal Legislative Assembly election, Tigga contesting on an election ticket from BJP defeated his nearest rival Padam Lama of All India Trinamool Congress by 22,308 votes.

He contested 2009 Indian general election from Alipurduars constituency and was defeated by Manohar Tirkey of Revolutionary Socialist Party (India).

References

Living people
1973 births
People from Alipurduar district
Bharatiya Janata Party politicians from West Bengal
Bengali Hindus
West Bengal MLAs 2016–2021
West Bengal MLAs 2021–2026